High Integrity C++ (HIC++ or formerly HICPP) is a software coding standard for the C++ programming language developed by Programming Research Limited, now part of Perforce Software. HIC++ was first published in October 2003. The latest revision, version 4.0, was released in October 2013 and documents 155 rules that restrict the use of ISO C++ language to improve software maintenance and reliability in high reliability or safety critical applications.

The Motor Industry Software Reliability Association (MISRA) C++ coding standard reference list includes High Integrity C++ .

Tools
Notable tools that check for compliance with High Integrity C++ are:
 LDRA Testbed by Liverpool Data Research Associates
 Helix QAC (formerly Programming Research Limited QA-C++)
 Parasoft C/C++test by Parasoft

Revision history
 1.0 – 3 October 2003
 2.0 – 20 October 2003
 3.0 – 24 January 2008
 4.0 – 3 October 2013

References

External links
 

C++
C programming language family
High Integrity Programming Language
History of computing in the United Kingdom
Programming language standards